South Aceh Regency is a regency in the Aceh special region of Indonesia. It is located on the west coast of the island of Sumatra. The regency covers an area of 4,173.82 square kilometres and had a population of 202,251 at the 2010 Census and 232,414 at the 2020 Census; the official estimate as at mid 2021 was 234,630.
The seat of the regency government is at Tapaktuan. Some of the people of the regency are Minangkabau-descended Aneuk Jamee.

Administrative districts 
At the time of the 2010 Census, the regency was divided administratively into sixteen districts (kecamatan). Subsequent to 2010, two additional districts (Trumon Tengah and Kota Bahagia) were created by being carved out of existing districts. The districts are listed below with their areas and populations at the 2010 Census and the 2020 Census, together with the official estimates for mid 2021. The 2020 populations are mostly rounded to the nearest 100 people. The table also includes the locations of the district administrative centres, the number of villages (rural desa and urban kelurahan) in each district, and its postal codes.

Note: (a) including small offshore islands. (b) The 2010 population of Trumon Tengah District is included in the 2010 figure for Trumon Timur District, from which it was split. (c) The Trumon area which forms the southern 28% of the Regency is adjacent to the city of Subulussalam to the east. (d) The 2010 population of Kota Bahagia District is included in the 2010 figure for Bakongan District, from which it was split.

See also 

 List of regencies and cities of Indonesia

References

External links
 South Aceh Regency 

 
Regencies of Aceh